Iliseva Batibasaga (born 23 March 1985) is a former Fijian-Australian rugby union player. She represented  in 27 tests between 2006 and 2022.

Batibasaga was named in the Wallaroos side for the 2006 Rugby World Cup in Canada. She was also a member of the squad to the 2010 Rugby World Cup that finished in third place. She was part of the Australian women's sevens team at the 2013 Sevens World Cup in Moscow.

In 2022, She was named in Australia's squad for the Pacific Four Series in New Zealand. She was also named in the side for the two-test series against the Black Ferns for the O'Reilly Cup.

Batibasaga also made the Wallaroos for the delayed 2022 Rugby World Cup in New Zealand. She announced her retirement from international rugby in December.

Personal life 
Batibasaga is a cousin of Nemani Nadolo, Chris Kuridrani, Tevita Kuridrani and former Wallaby Lote Tuqiri. She works as an Early Childhood Teacher.

References

External links
Wallaroos Profile

1985 births
Living people
Australia women's international rugby union players
Australian female rugby union players
Australian female rugby sevens players
Rugby union scrum-halves
Australian people of I-Taukei Fijian descent